Claude Cheysson (13 April 1920 – 15 October 2012) was a French Socialist politician who served as Foreign Minister in the government of Pierre Mauroy from 1981 to 1984.

Career
Cheysson was born in Paris and attended the Cours Hattemer, a private school. He fled from France during World War II and joined the 2nd Armored Division of General Leclerc, serving as a second lieutenant in the 12th Chasseurs d'Afrique Regiment. He joined the Foreign Ministry in 1948 and became head of the liaison service with the West German authorities the following year. As he moved through the ranks of the Foreign Ministry, he served as counselor to the president of the government of French Indochina in 1952, cabinet chief of Premier Pierre Mendès France from 1954 to 1955, and general secretary of the Commission for Technical Cooperation in Africa from 1957 to 1962. He was director of the Organisme Saharien from 1962 until 1965, and ambassador to Indonesia from 1966 to 1969.

In 1973, Cheysson was appointed as the French European Commissioner.  His first post, which he held until 1977, was in charge of development policy, cooperation, budgets, and financial control. From 1977 until 1981, he took on the development portfolio.

In 1981 he left the commission and became a member of the French Government, serving as Minister of Foreign Affairs until 1984. (The ministry was renamed as the Ministry of External Relations, but the previous name was re-established in 1986.) He joined the Delors Commission, where he was responsible for Mediterranean policy and north–south relations, from 1985 to 1989.

By 1999, Cheysson joined the Collectif Liberté pour l'Afghanistan, an organization lobbying for the West to stop tolerating the Taliban and "Osama bin Laden, the millionaire Saudi financier of terror".

References

Rulers.org

1920 births
2012 deaths
Politicians from Paris
20th-century French diplomats
French Foreign Ministers
Socialist Party (France) politicians
French European Commissioners
École Polytechnique alumni
École nationale d'administration alumni
French military personnel of World War II
French Army officers
Ambassadors of France to Indonesia
Honorary Knights Grand Cross of the Order of St Michael and St George
European Commissioners 1973–1977
European Commissioners 1977–1981
European Commissioners 1981–1985
European Commissioners 1985–1988
French expatriates in Vietnam